"G-Get Up and Dance!" is the lead single from Canadian rock band Faber Drive's second album, Can't Keep a Secret. It debuted and peaked at number 6 on the Canadian Hot 100.

The song debuted on Halifax, Nova Scotia radio station 101.3 The Bounce in July 2009.

The music video was released on August 19, 2009 via their official YouTube page.

The band wrote and recorded "G-Get Up and Dance!" in Faber's barn. One night, they were in a bar and someone, who was working at the bar, noticed them and instantly put on "Second Chance". "Everyone just decided to go get drinks so the band decided to write a fun, party song".

They were originally planning on releasing "G-Get Up and Dance!" under a side project called "Badass Moustache" but their record label convinced them to release it under Faber Drive.

It was also co-written by Ricarda Faber, Faber's wife.

Charts

Year-end charts

References

2009 singles
Faber Drive songs
Songs written by Brian Howes
Songs written by Pierre Bouvier
2009 songs
Universal Records singles
The Wild & Turning Red